Leonard Rodwell Wilkinson (born 15 October 1868) was an English footballer who earned one cap for the national team in 1891. Wilkinson played club football for Oxford University.

External links

1868 births
Year of death unknown
English footballers
England international footballers
Oxford University A.F.C. players
Footballers from Highgate
Association football goalkeepers